The 2019 World Artistic Gymnastics Championships was held in Stuttgart, Germany from October 4–13, 2019. The championships took place at the Hanns-Martin-Schleyer-Halle, and was the third time the city of Stuttgart hosted the event following the 1989 and 2007 editions, and the fifth time Germany hosted it.

As of October 2, 92 federations registered gymnasts for the event with a total of 288 men and 259 women.

Sam Mikulak of the United States and Mélanie de Jesus dos Santos of France won the Longines Prize for Elegance. Both mark a first for their respective countries: de Jesus dos Santos is the first gymnast from France to win this prize, and Mikulak is the first male gymnast from the United States to win one.

Competition schedule
Listed in local time (UTC+2).

MG – Mixed Group.

Medal summary

Medalists
Names with an asterisk (*) denote the team alternate.

Medal standings

Overall

Men

Women

Men's results

Team
Russia won their first team gold since the collapse of the Soviet Union. The team event also marks the first time for Chinese Taipei to make the team final and as a result they qualified for the 2020 Olympics in Tokyo.

Individual all-around
Kim Han-sol of South Korea withdrew and was replaced by first alternate Loris Frasca of France. Cuba's Manrique Larduet also withdrew and was replaced by second alternate Robert Tvorogal of Lithuania.

2018 World champion Artur Dalaloyan and bronze medalist Nikita Nagornyy, both of Russia, returned to the podium for the second consecutive year, winning silver and gold, respectively. Ukraine's Oleg Verniaiev, the 2016 Olympic silver medalist, won his first World medal in the all-around. Defending silver medalist Xiao Ruoteng of China narrowly missed the all-around podium for the first time this quad, finishing behind Verniaiev by less than three tenths.

Floor
Carlos Yulo, the youngest competitor in the final, improved on his bronze-medal finish from the 2018 World Championships to win the Philippines' first-ever World title in artistic gymnastics. No Japanese gymnast made the podium for the first time since the 2009 World Championships; the team's highest finisher in qualifications, Daiki Hashimoto, was the third reserve.

Pommel horse
Max Whitlock of Great Britain won his third pommel horse title. Rhys McClenaghan of Ireland became his country's first world medalist by earning the bronze.

Rings
Turkey's İbrahim Çolak won the country's first-ever World title in artistic gymnastics. For the first time in the 2016–2020 Olympic cycle, not a single still rings Olympic medalist managed to finish on the podium. The current Olympic champion, silver medalist, and bronze medalist finished fourth, fifth, and sixth, respectively, the same order as their 2016 Olympic finish.

Vault

Parallel bars
Two-time and reigning World Champion Zou Jingyuan of China failed to qualify to the final to try and win a third title in a row. Despite this, he earned the highest score of the competition in the team final with a 16.383. Joe Fraser of Great Britain became the first British athlete to win the gold on the parallel bars.

Horizontal bar
Brazil's Arthur Mariano became the first Brazilian athlete to win the gold medal on the high bar.

Women's results

Team
After qualifying in eighth place, Italy won the team bronze medal, their first team medal at a World Championships since 1950. Meanwhile, the United States extended their streak to five consecutive World Championship team gold medals, tying the record set by Romania (1994-2001).  The USA's team gold medal is also the 21st World Championship medal for Simone Biles, giving her the record for the most World Championship medals won by a female gymnast. The previous record, 20 medals, was first set by Svetlana Khorkina in 2001 and tied by Biles at the 2018 World Artistic Gymnastics Championships.

Individual all-around
Sixth-place qualifier Liu Tingting of China withdrew and was replaced by teammate Tang Xijing, who had been affected by the two-per-country rule; the start list was not reseeded and Tang replaced Liu in the top rotation group.

Simone Biles continued to extend her record streak, winning her fifth title. Tang would go to win silver, matching China's best-ever finish from Jiang Yuyuan at the 2010 World Championships. Angelina Melnikova's bronze is her first individual Worlds medal. The defending silver and bronze medalists, Mai Murakami of Japan and Morgan Hurd of the United States, both did not make their countries' respective teams for the World Championships.

Vault

Uneven bars

Balance beam
Eighth-place qualifier Ellie Black of Canada withdrew after sustaining an injury during the all-around final earlier in the week and was replaced by first alternate Kara Eaker of the United States; Eaker previously had qualified into the final, before dropping to first alternate following an inquiry about her score in qualification.

Simone Biles' gold medal in the event was her 24th World Championships medal, breaking the record for the most world medals earned by a single gymnast. The previous record, 23 medals, had been set by Belarusian gymnast Vitaly Scherbo at the 1996 World Artistic Gymnastics Championships.

Floor
Eighth-place qualifier Nina Derwael of Belgium withdrew from the competition as a precaution to avoid aggravating a lingering injury, allowing first reserve Brooklyn Moors of Canada to take her place. Moors had previously qualified to the final, before an inquiry about her score in qualification dropped her to first alternate.

Qualification

Men's results

Team
The top 9 teams qualify to the 2020 Summer Olympic Games, excluding the teams already qualified during the 2018 World Artistic Gymnastics Championships.

Individual all-around

Floor

Pommel horse

Rings

Vault

Parallel bars

Horizontal bar

Women's results

Team
The top 9 teams qualify to the 2020 Summer Olympic Games, excluding the teams already qualified during the 2018 World Artistic Gymnastics Championships.

Individual all-around

Vault

Uneven bars

Balance beam

Floor

Participating nations

  (1)
  (4)
  (8)
  (4)
  (11)
  (6)
  (4)
  (12)
  (8)
  (2)
  (12)
  (3)
  (12)
  (1)
  (4)
  (12)
  (6)
  (5)
  (4)
  (4)
  (5)
  (9)
  (6)
  (4)
  (3)
  (8)
  (3)
  (12)
  (9)
  (12)
  (12)
  (4)
  (12)
  (6)
  (5)
  (6)
  (12)
  (2)
  (6)
  (2)
  (5)
  (3)
  (6)
  (12)
  (6)
  (3)
  (12)
  (6)
  (12)
  (3)
  (6)
  (4)
  (1)
  (2)
  (4)
  (9)
  (1)
  (1)
  (12)
  (5)
  (9)
  (5)
  (2)
  (6)
  (1)
  (4)
  (5)
  (7)
  (6)
  (3)
  (12)
  (3)
  (12)
  (1)
  (6)
  (5)
  (1)
  (12)
  (3)
  (5)
  (1)
  (2)
  (9)
  (1)
  (2)
  (9)
  (11)
  (3)
  (12)
  (6)
  (3)
  (6)

References

World Artistic Gymnastics Championships
World Artistic Gymnastics Championships
2019 in German sport
Gymnastics Championships
Sports competitions in Stuttgart
Gymnastics in Germany
World Artistic Gymnastics Championships

External Links
Results Book